Romus Valton "R.V." Burgin (August 13, 1922 – April 6, 2019) was a United States Marine and American author. As a young man, he served in the Pacific Theater during World War II.

Burgin was the author of the memoir Islands of the Damned: A Marine at War in the Pacific (with William Marvel). Burgin is portrayed in the HBO miniseries The Pacific by Martin McCann.  Burgin himself appears in documentary footage during the miniseries.

Early life and family
Burgin was born to Joseph Harmon Burgin and Beulah May (née Perry) Burgin in Jewett, Texas. He attended and graduated from Jewett High School in 1940 where he had been Captain of the football team.  

Burgin's younger brother, Joseph ("Joe" or "J.D.") Delton (March 24, 1926 – February 17, 1945) joined the United States Army, after changing his year of birth from 1926 to 1925, and was sent to Europe,  as a member of Company "C", 274th Infantry Regiment, 70th Infantry Division ("Trailblazers").  Joseph died in Alsace-Lorraine on February 17, 1945, when he was killed by artillery fire near the river Saar and the town of Forbach, as they moved east toward Saarbrücken on the other side of the river, as part of a push against the Siegfried Line.  He is buried at the Sardis Cemetery next to his parents.

Military career
Burgin joined the United States Marine Corps on November 13, 1942, during World War II and was assigned to the 9th Replacement Battalion.  He soon became a mortarman in K-Company, 3rd Battalion, 5th Marines, 1st Marine Division (K/3/5), and fought in the Pacific War at Cape Gloucester, then alongside his friends Eugene Sledge and Merriell "Snafu" Shelton, on Peleliu, and Okinawa.  Burgin was promoted to the rank of sergeant upon reaching Okinawa.

He was awarded a Bronze Star for his actions in the Battle of Okinawa on 2 May 1945, when he destroyed a Japanese machine gun emplacement that had his company pinned down.  He also was going to be put in for a Silver Star by Captain Andrew "Ack-Ack" Haldane for taking out a pillbox on Peleliu, but Haldane was killed by sniper fire before he could submit it.

Personal life
In 1946 he began working for the United States Post Office and was employed there until he retired in 1977. While on leave in Melbourne during World War II, Burgin met an Australian woman, Florence Riseley. They married in Dallas on January 29, 1947.  The couple had four daughters.
 
Burgin did not speak about the war, not even to his family, until he met other veterans and decided to author his book. Burgin then became a fixture at veterans events and was one of seven grand marshals in the 2015 Dallas Veterans Day Parade.

Burgin died on April 6, 2019, at the age of 96 in Lancaster, Texas, and is buried next to his wife at Rawlins Cemetery.

Bibliography

See also
List of U.S. Marines
List of non-fiction writers
List of writers
List of people from Texas
Eugene Sledge
Merriell Shelton

References

1922 births
2019 deaths
People from Jewett, Texas
United States Marine Corps personnel of World War II
United States Marines
American memoirists
Writers from Texas
People from Lancaster, Texas
Military personnel from Texas